Nazemabad (also Romanized as Nāz̧emābād; also known as Tāzehābād and Tāzehābād-e Dīzaj) is a village in Chaharduli-ye Gharbi Rural District, Chaharduli District, Qorveh County, Kurdistan Province, Iran. At the 2006 census, its population was 396, in 97 families. The village is populated by Kurds.

References 

Towns and villages in Qorveh County
Kurdish settlements in Kurdistan Province